NGC 6522 is a globular cluster  in the constellation Sagittarius. It is apparent magnitude 8.3, and diameter 16.4 arc minutes, and class VI with stars 16th magnitude and dimmer. It was discovered by William Herschel on June 24, 1784. It is centered in a region of the sky known as Baade's Window.

NGC 6522 is possibly the oldest star cluster in the Milky Way, with an age of more than 12 billion years.

Gallery

References

External links

NGC6522, Galactic Globular Clusters Database page

Globular clusters
Sagittarius (constellation)
6522